Porin Ässät ry is a sports club based in Pori, Finland. The club's only programs are ice hockey and esports, but it used to have an association football program. Porin Ässät ry operates an ice hockey team in the Finnish Elite League. Porin Ässät ry also has junior teams for all age groups from U7 to U20. Porin Ässät ry also operate a women's ice hockey school and the girl's junior ice hockey department while also operating a skating school.

Sports

Men's ice hockey 

Ässät's ice hockey department started in 1967 when two local clubs, RU-38 and Karhut, merged. Since 1967, Ässät has won three Finnish Championships (1971, 1978 and 2013) and one Finnish Cup (Suomen Cup in Finnish)

For the 2022–23 season, Ässät plays in the Liiga, the top-tier of ice hockey in Finland.

Women's ice hockey 

Ässät women's ice hockey department was established in 1981 and it was one of the ten teams that formed the Naisten SM-sarja (now Naisten Liiga).

The team was disestablished in 2003, but was re-established as an ice hockey school in 2020.

Men's football 

Ässät men's football section was formed in 1967. Ässät inherited RU-38's place in the Mestaruussarja, where they played for two seasons before being relegated. The football club folded in 1981.

Ässät managed to win one U19 championship in 1970.

Companies Porin Ässät ry operates

HC Ässät Pori Oy 

HC Ässät Pori Oy was made into a separate organization from Porin Ässät ry in 2000. Porin Ässät ry owns 75,6% of HC Ässät Pori Oy. HC Ässät Pori Oy owns the Porin Ässät men's ice hockey team and the Porin Ässät U20 team. HC Ässät Pori Oy previously owned parts of the Isomäki Areena, an ice hockey arena in Pori, but sold it to the City of Pori because of financial troubles.

Patajunnuareena Oy 

Patajunnuareena Oy is a company that Porin Ässät ry owns. Patajunnuareena Oy was founded in 2007 for the building and upkeeping of the Astora Areena, an ice hockey arena located next to the Isomäki Areena in Pori.

Pata Production Oy 

Pata Productions Oy is a company owned by Porin Ässät ry. Its purpose is to support Ässät's ice hockey junior teams. Pata Production Oy rents metal fence elements to event organizers of different sizes. In addition, the company rents metallic ladder elements. The money the company produces goes towards the junior teams. Pata Production Oy was founded in 2012.

References